Uff! was a Venezuelan boy band founded in 2000. Similar in style to Menudo, Los Chicos and Los Chamos, they mimicked the fashion style of contemporary American boy bands like No Authority, Backstreet Boys and Hanson. In 2001, the band's debut album  achieved a golden record in Mexico.

Members
Uff! was composed of:
 Alexander Da Silva - born 2 October 1985 in Caracas
 Fabio Melannitto - born 3 February 1985 in Caracas - Died 15 August 2018 in Mexico City
 Rawy Mattar - born 14 August 1985 in Caracas
 Jean Ducournau - born 9 December 1984 in Caracas
 José Luis Graterol - born 27 September 1986 in Caracas
 Marcos Causa - born 12 September 1987 in Caracas
 Luis Fernando - born 22 November 1985 in Mexico

Member Fabio Melannitto was murdered while driving in a motorcycle in Mexico City. The assailants are still being searched for.

Discography
Albums
 Ya lo ves (2000)

 Uff!oria latina (2001)
 

 A 10 centímetros (2003)
 

 Numa competição CTF (2019)

References

External links
 http://cluboficialconuff.galeon.com/ (In Spanish)

Venezuelan boy bands
Musical groups established in the 2000s